George Hawker may refer to:

 George Charles Hawker (1818–1895), South Australian settler and politician
 George Stanley Hawker (1894–1979), South Australian politician